Horatio Clifford Claypool (February 9, 1859 – January 19, 1921) was a three term U.S. Representative from Ohio. He was the father of Harold Kile Claypool and cousin of John Barney Peterson.

Biography
Born in McArthur, Vinton County, Ohio, Claypool attended the common schools, and graduated from National Normal University in Lebanon, Ohio, in 1880.
He studied law and was admitted to the bar in 1882 and commenced practice in Chillicothe, Ohio.
He served as prosecuting attorney of Ross County from 1899 to 1903 and as probate judge of the county from 1905 to 1910.

Congress
Claypool was elected as a Democrat to the Sixty-second and Sixty-third Congresses (March 4, 1911 – March 3, 1915).
He was an unsuccessful candidate for reelection in 1914 to the Sixty-fourth Congress.

Claypool was elected to the Sixty-fifth Congress (March 4, 1917 – March 3, 1919).
He was an unsuccessful candidate for reelection in 1918 to the Sixty-sixth Congress.
He resumed the practice of law in Chillicothe, Ohio.

Death
He died in Columbus, Ohio on January 19, 1921.
He was interred in Grandview Cemetery, Chillicothe, Ross County, Ohio, USA.

Sources

1859 births
1921 deaths
People from McArthur, Ohio
People from Chillicothe, Ohio
National Normal University alumni
Democratic Party members of the United States House of Representatives from Ohio
County district attorneys in Ohio
Burials at Grandview Cemetery (Chillicothe, Ohio)